George Babcock may refer to:

 George Babcock (American football) (1899–1988), American football player and coach
 George Herman Babcock (1832–1893), American inventor
 George Reed Babcock (1806–1876), New York politician
 George Carlos Babcock (1876–1921), American racecar driver
 George Wait Babcock (1751–1816), American privateer of the American Revolution